Kristofer Karlsson (born 26 October 1992 in Bondi, New South Wales) is an Australian team handball player.

Career
Kristofer lives in Stockholm, Sweden and plays for HIFK in Finlands highest league.

In 2010 he joined the Australian team Australian national team (under the name of "The Southern Stars") and participated in the IHF Super Globe. In 2011 Kristofer participated in the Intercontinental Trophy Cup where he was awarded "Best Goalkeeper". In 2013 Kristofer was picked to play the 23rd World Championship in Spain, the youngest goalkeeper and 2nd youngest player in the tournament.

He has since represented Australia at the 2014 Oceania Handball Championship, 2015 IHF Emerging Nations Championship, 2016 Rio Olympic Qualifiers and World Cup Qualifiers in Qatar and South Korea.

References

External links
AHF-Junior Mens
Profile on AHF Webpage
National Senior Team World Championship
Super Globe Tournament
Handball Planet
Scoresway profile

1992 births
Living people
Australian male handball players
Swedish male handball players